The dioxygenyl ion, is a rarely-encountered oxycation in which both oxygen atoms have a formal oxidation state of .  It is formally derived from oxygen by the removal of an electron:

O2 →  + e−

The energy change for this process is called the ionization energy of the oxygen molecule. Relative to most molecules, this ionization energy is very high at 1175 kJ/mol.

Structure and molecular properties
 has a bond order of 2.5, and a bond length of 112.3 pm in solid O2[AsF6]. It is isoelectronic with nitric oxide and is paramagnetic. The bond energy is 625.1 kJ mol−1 and the stretching frequency is 1858 cm−1, both of which are high relative to most of the molecules.

Synthesis

Neil Bartlett demonstrated that dioxygenyl hexafluoroplatinate (O2PtF6), containing the dioxygenyl cation, can be prepared at room temperature by direct reaction of oxygen gas (O2) with platinum hexafluoride (PtF6):

O2 + PtF6 → 

The compound can also be prepared from a mixture of fluorine and oxygen gases in the presence of a platinum sponge at 450 °C, and from oxygen difluoride above 400 °C:

6  + 2 Pt → 2  + 

At lower temperatures (around 350 °C), platinum tetrafluoride is produced instead of dioxygenyl hexafluoroplatinate.  Dioxygenyl hexafluoroplatinate played a pivotal role in the discovery of noble gas compounds.  The observation that PtF6 is a powerful enough oxidising agent to oxidise O2 (which has a first ionization potential of 12.2 eV) led Bartlett to reason that it should also be able to oxidise xenon (first ionization potential 12.13 eV). His subsequent investigation yielded the first compound of a noble gas, xenon hexafluoroplatinate.

 is also found in similar compounds of the form O2MF6, where M is arsenic (As), antimony (Sb), gold (Au), niobium (Nb), ruthenium (Ru), rhenium (Re), rhodium (Rh), vanadium (V), or phosphorus (P). Other forms are also attested, including O2GeF5 and (O2)2SnF6.

The tetrafluoroborate and hexafluorophosphate salts may be prepared by the reaction of dioxygen difluoride with boron trifluoride or phosphorus pentafluoride at −126 °C:

2 O2F2 + 2 BF3 → 2 O2BF4 + F2
2 O2F2 + 2 PF5 → 2 O2PF6 + F2

These compounds rapidly decompose at room temperature:
2 O2BF4 → 2 O2 + F2 + 2 BF3
2 O2PF6 → 2 O2 + F2 + 2 PF5

Some compounds including O2Sn2F9, O2Sn2F9·0.9HF, O2GeF5·HF, and O2[Hg(HF)]4(SbF6)9 can be made by ultraviolet irradiation of oxygen and fluorine dissolved in anhydrous hydrogen fluoride with a metal oxide.

All attempts to prepare  with chloro anions like  met with failure.

Reactions

The reaction of O2BF4 with xenon at  produces a white solid believed to be F–Xe–BF2, containing an unusual xenon-boron bond:

2 O2BF4 + 2 Xe → 2 O2 + F2 + 2 FXeBF2

The dioxygenyl salts O2BF4 and O2AsF6 react with carbon monoxide to give oxalyl fluoride, C2O2F2, in high yield.

References

External links

Oxycations
Oxygen